Nihan Su (born 22 August 1981) is a Turkish football manager and former footballer. She was a member of the Turkey U19 and Turkey national teams.

Private life
Nihan Su was born in Ankara in 1981. She compşeted her primary and secondary education in her home town. She studied teacher of Sports and Physical Education at Gazi University, and graduated in 2002. She took a Master's degree in 22005.

She served as an academic at the Sportsand Physical Education College at the Kocaeli University.

Playing career
Club
Su started her football playing career in 1995. Between 1999 and 2003, she played in the clubs Ankara Metropoliten Municipality, Ankara Gürtaşspor, Bursa Delphi Packard and Gazi Üniversitesispor. In 2006, she retired form active playing.

International
She was a member of the Turkey U19 and Turkey national teams.

She participated at the UEFA Women's Under-18 Championship qualifyings in 1998 (2  matches), 1999 (2), 2000  First (2) and Second (3). For the Turkey women's national team, she played at the UEFA Women's Euro 2001 qualifying (3 matches), and the 2003 FIFA Women's World Cup qualification (UEFA) (7). At the 2005 Summer Universiade in İzmer, Turkey, she captained the Turkey national team.

Managerial career
Su holds an UEFA coaching licence.

 Gazi Üniversitesispor
Her managerial career began at Gazi Üniversitesispor.

 Turkey women's national teams
From 2008 on, she worked at the Turkish Football Federation. She served as trainer of the Turkey U15, Turkey U17, Turkey U19 and the Turkey national teans between 2006 and 2014. She served as assistant trainer of the Turkey U17 (2010), Yutkey U19 (2019–2010) and the Turkey <(2011), as well as trainer of the Turkey U15 (2009–2010) and the Turkey (2008–2010, 2012). She managed the Turkey women's national deaf football team at the 2017 Summer Deaflympics held in Samsun, Turkey. In 2011, she became manager of the Turkey team.

 Fenerbahçe wome's
In 2021, she was appointed manager of the newly established Turkish Women's Football Super League club Fenerbahçe women's football team.

References

1981 births
Living people
Footballers from Ankara
Gazi University alumni
Turkish women's footballers
Women's association football defenders
Turkey women's international footballers
Gazi Üniversitesispor players
Turkish female association football managers
Turkish women's football managers
Fenerbahçe S.K. (women's football) managers